An election to North Tipperary County Council took place on 27 June 1991 as part of that year's Irish local elections. 21 councillors were elected from four electoral divisions by PR-STV voting for an eight-year term of office.

Results by party

Results by Electoral Area

Borrisokane

Nenagh-Newport

Roscrea-Templemore

Thurles

External links

1991 Irish local elections
1991